WIDI (99.5 FM), branded on-air as Magic 97.3/99.5, is a radio station broadcasting an Adult Contemporary format. Licensed to Quebradillas, Puerto Rico, the station serves the Puerto Rico area. The station is currently owned by Magic Radio Networks.

History
The station went on the air as WREI on 1974-05-09. It is remembered for its "Radio Rey" moniker. on 1993-06-01 the station changed its call sign to WQQZ, better known as "Sonorama", then known as "QQZ", later as a repeater of La Mega. on 2000-10-25 the station changed its ownership to FM Media Corporation and its callsign to the former WIDI, on 2006-02-07 to WOYE, on 2006-02-22 to the current WIDI.

References

External links

IDI
Radio stations established in 1974
Quebradillas, Puerto Rico
1974 establishments in Puerto Rico